King Delux Football Club,, was a short-lived Armenian football club from Abovyan, Kotayk Province.

The club was founded in 2012 by the transport company King Deluxe owned by Artur Harutyunyan. and participated in the 2012–13 season of the Armenian First League. However, the club was dissolved during the same season, after only playing 10 matches in the league.

League and domestic cup history

References

Defunct football clubs in Armenia
Association football clubs established in 2012
2012 establishments in Armenia
Association football clubs disestablished in 2012
2012 disestablishments in Armenia